Ecstatic Peace Library is a British publishing company founded by Thurston Moore and visual book editor Eva Prinz in 2010. The name is derived from Ecstatic Peace!, a music label run by Thurston Moore. The company publishes mainly poetry, but also a collection of books about the early Norwegian black metal scene, experimental jazz from the 70s and other niche subjects.

On 5 September 2018 Ecstatic Peace Library announced they would release the debut album Sistahs by the London band Big Joanie as part of their new Daydream Library Series. Each release is accompanied by a limited edition fanzine, edited by Moore, Prinz and the musicians.

Sources

External links
Ecstatic Peace! Library website

Book publishing companies of the United Kingdom
Publishing companies established in 2010
Visual arts publishing companies